Brazilosaurus is an extinct genus of mesosaur which lived during the early Permian (Artinskian stage) of what is now Brazil. It is known from specimen BSPG 1965 I 131, a single skeleton recovered from the Assistencia Member of the Irati Formation (Hanayama Farm, Tatuí, São Paulo), in the Paraná Basin. It was named by T. Shikama and H. Ozaki in 1966 and the type species is Brazilosaurus sanpauloensis.

Brazilosaurus is not to be confused with the archosaur Brasileosaurus.

References 

Parareptiles
Prehistoric reptile genera
Prehistoric marine reptiles
Permian reptiles of South America
Permian Brazil
Fossils of Brazil
Paraná Basin
Fossil taxa described in 1966